St. Mary's Dominican Church and Priory, Pope's Quay in Cork, Ireland, is run by the Dominican Order. It serves as a local church and a priory housing a community of Dominican friars, and a novitiate for the order.

Building of the church on the Pope's Quay site commenced in 1832, and the church opened on October 20, 1839, with Daniel O'Connell in attendance. The architect was Kearns Deane, a Protestant and from the Deane family of architects, for no charge, and Fr B.T. Russell was responsible for delivering the church. In 1850 architect William Atkins built the priory in a neo-Romanesque style. George Goldie designed all the elements of the sanctuary (including the pulpit and the high altar). Extensive renovations to the church took place in 1991. The St Martin's Chapel, at St. Mary's was restored and renovated in 2017.

A chapter of the Lay Dominicans meets in the Pastoral Centre, also, counseling services are offered from the centre, as well as being used for meetings of other groups such as Alcoholics, Narcotics, and Gamblers Anonymous. In 2021 the priory applied to extend the use of the pastoral centre so as it could be used as a school.
St Mary's, hosts talks and the order runs and members of the community lecture on a number of short courses in theology, philosophy, and Christology.

Novitiate
St. Mary's Cork serves as the Novitiate for the Dominicans' Province of Ireland, where a novice would spend a year, studying philosophy. After completing a year Novices make their first simple profession, before progressing to the Studium (St. Saviour’s Priory, Dublin) for further study in philosophy and theology and taking vows.

People Associated with St. Mary's Priory, Cork
 Gerard Dunne, OP, Prior
 B.T. Russell, OP, Prior, Provincial of the Irish Dominicans
 John A. Ryan, OP, STM, Prior
 John Pius Leahy, OP, educated a professor in Lisbon, prior in St. Mary's, before becoming Bishop of Dromore
  J. M. Moore OP, served as prior in St. Mary's Cork, he proceeded to be prior in St. Mary's Tallaght

References

Dominican churches
Dominican monasteries in the Republic of Ireland
Roman Catholic churches in Cork (city)
Roman Catholic churches completed in 1839
19th-century Roman Catholic church buildings in Ireland
19th-century churches in the Republic of Ireland